= Lake Stropu =

Lake in Latvia

Coordinates: 55.913°N 26.595°E

- Stropu ezers (Latvian); Озеро Стропы (Russian)
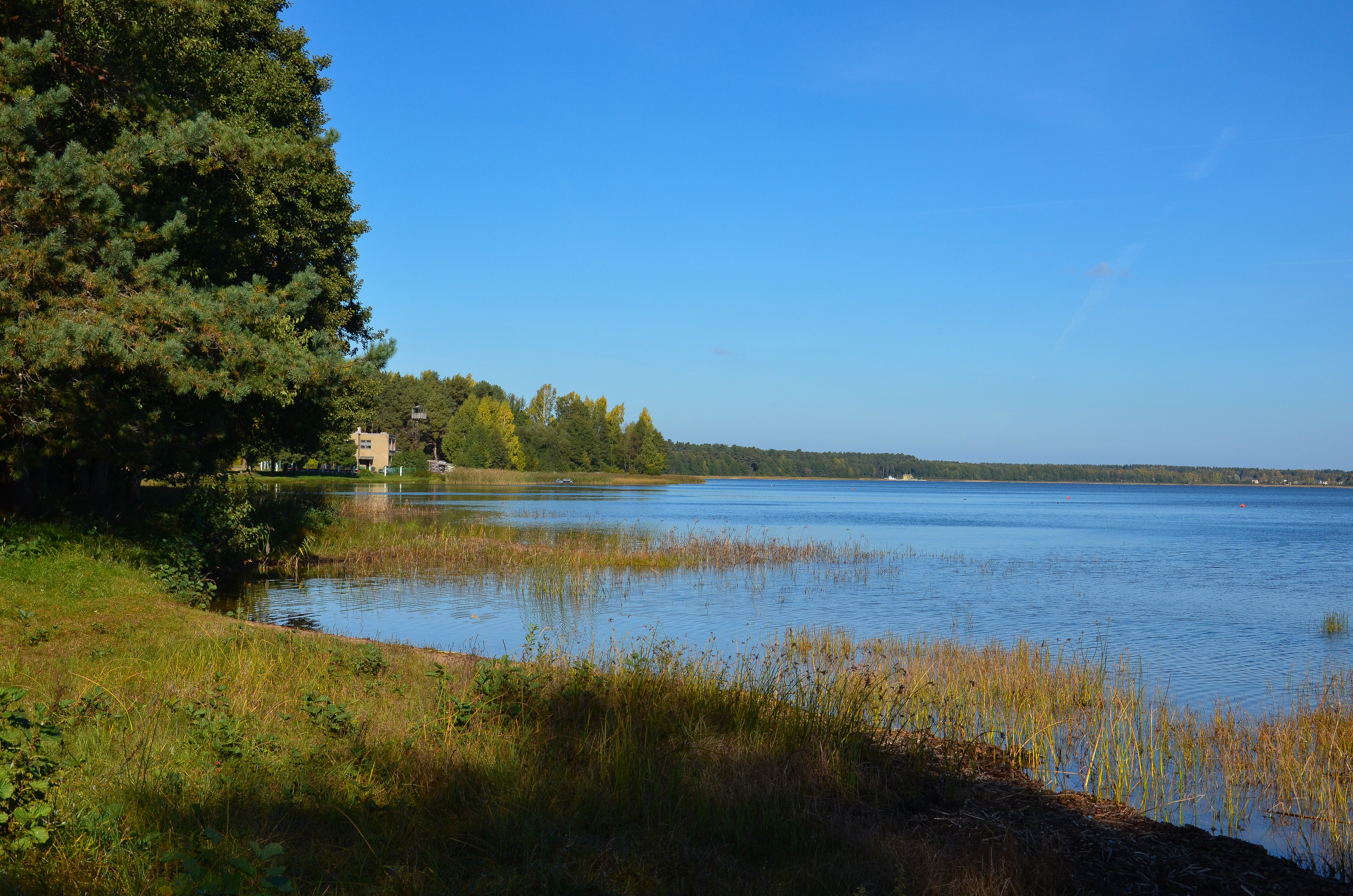
- Southwestern shore of Lake Stropu
- Interactive map of Lake Stropu
- Location: Daugavpils, Latvia
- Surface area: 4.179 square kilometres (1.614 sq mi)
- Average depth: 3.6 metres (12 ft)
- Max. depth: 6.3 metres (21 ft)

Lake Stropu (Latvian: Stropu ezers, Russian: Озеро Стропы) is a lake located in Daugavpils, Latvia.
